A Gamble in Lives is a 1920 British silent drama film directed by George Ridgwell and starring Malvina Longfellow, Norman McKinnel and Alec Fraser. It is based on the play The Joan Danvers by Frank Stayton.

Plot
An insurance agent demands a shipowner's daughter in return for silence regarding scuttling plans.

Cast
 Malvina Longfellow as Joan Danvers  
 Norman McKinnel as James Danvers 
 Alec Fraser as Captain Ross 
 John Reid as Jimmie Danvers  
 Molly Adair as Gladys Danvers 
 Frances Ivor as Mrs. Danvers 
 Bobby Andrews as Harry Riggs  
 Alec Wynn-Thomas as Sims

References

Bibliography
 Low, Rachael. History of the British Film, 1918-1929. George Allen & Unwin, 1971.

External links

1920 films
1920 drama films
British silent feature films
British drama films
Films directed by George Ridgwell
British black-and-white films
1920s English-language films
1920s British films
Silent drama films